Portrait of Cooper Penrose is an 1802 oil painting on canvas by Jacques-Louis David. It depicts the Irish Quaker Cooper Penrose.

References

1802 paintings
Paintings by Jacques-Louis David
Paintings in the collection of the Timken Museum of Art
Paintings of people